Pang Chol-gap (born 1935/1936) is a North Korean politician. He is the chairperson of the Pyongyang Municipal People's Committee in North Korea.

On 4 January 2007, in Pyongyang, Pang gave a speech at a mass rally, with other high government officials praising Songun Korea. In the speech, he also confirmed North Korea has nuclear weapons.

References

1930s births
Living people
North Korean military personnel
Workers' Party of Korea politicians
Korean communists